Jon Mooallem is an American journalist and author.

Career

Journalism
Mooallem is a contributing writer for The New York Times Magazine, where he often writes about the relationship between humans and animals. Mooallem is a contributor to American Public Radio's series This American Life. He is also Writer At Large for the live publication Pop-Up Magazine.

Books
Mooallem's book Wild Ones was published in 2013 by Penguin Press and was one of the New York Times Book Review’s 100 Notable Books of 2013. In spring 2020, Mooallem published This Is Chance!: The Shaking of An American City, The Voice That Held It Together, with Random House. Writer Elizabeth Gilbert said of the book, "Jon Mooallem is one of the most intelligent, compassionate, and curious authors writing today. I would go on any adventure that his mind embarks upon, knowing that I was being led by the ablest of guides."

Personal life
Mooallem lives with his family on Bainbridge Island, near Seattle, Washington. His podcast The Walking Podcast chronicles Mooallem's perambulations on the island. It was named one of 2019's Best Podcasts by The A.V. Club and New York Magazine's Vulture.com.

Cultural References
In 2013,  alt-bluegrass band Black Prairie released "Wild Ones," an album based on Mooallem's book.

Honors
 2013 Wild Ones New York Times Notable Book
 2013 Wild Ones The New Yorker Best Book of the Year
 2013 Wild Ones NPR Science Friday Best Book of the Year
 2013 Wild Ones Brainpickings Best Book of the Year
 2013 Wild Ones Outside Magazine Best Book of the Year
 2019 The Walking Podcast Podcast The A.V. Club Best Podcast of the Year
 2019 The Walking Podcast Podcast Vulture.com Best Podcast of the Year

Bibliography

External links
 Author's website
 The Walking Podcast
 Jon Mooallem Profile at Berkeley Journalism

References

American male journalists
The New York Times writers
American male non-fiction writers
Living people
Year of birth missing (living people)
Place of birth missing (living people)
21st-century American male writers
21st-century American journalists
21st-century American non-fiction writers
The New York Times Magazine